Nevison is a surname. Notable people with the surname include:

 John Nevison (1639–1684), British highwayman
 Ron Nevison, American record producer

See also
 Nevinson